Sujawalpur is a village in Bilhaur Tehsil, Kanpur Nagar district, Uttar Pradesh, India.

According to 2011 Census of India the total population of the village is 787.

References

Villages in Kanpur Nagar district